Fališe is a village in the municipality of Tetovo, North Macedonia.

History
According to the 1467-68 Ottoman defter, Fališe appears as being largely inhabited by an Orthodox Christian Albanian population. Some families had a mixed Slav-Albanian anthroponomy - usually a Slavic first name and an Albanian last name or last names with Albanian patronyms and Slavic suffixes.

The names are: Nilolla Arbanas (t.Arnaut); Mel-Milko, son of Nikolla; Harbat Arbanas (t. Arnaut); Nik-o, his son; Dik-o, son of Gjon; Stanisha, son of Marin; widow Prenka; Dushman, son of Vel-ko; Gjorgj-o, son of Marin.

Demographics
According to the 2021 census, the village had a total of 612 inhabitants. Ethnic groups in the village include:

Macedonians 552
Albanians 37
Serbs 5 
Others 18

References

External links

Villages in Tetovo Municipality